Nicol McColl (1812 – April 17, 1878) was an Ontario farmer and political figure. He represented Elgin West in the Legislative Assembly of Ontario as a Conservative member from 1867 to 1871.

He was born in Glen Orchy, Argyleshire, Scotland in 1812 and grew up there. McColl came to Upper Canada in 1831. He married Jeannet Campbell in 1845; in 1858, he married Mary McIntyre after his first wife's death. He served on the councils for Middlesex and Elgin counties. His son Dugald also later represented Elgin West in the legislative assembly. He died in Southwold in 1878, aged 66.

References

External links

1812 births
1878 deaths
Progressive Conservative Party of Ontario MPPs
Scottish emigrants to pre-Confederation Ontario
Immigrants to Upper Canada